Lieutenant General Chandi Prasad Mohanty  is a retired General Officer in the Indian Army. He was the 42nd Vice Chief of the Army Staff and assumed office on February 1, 2021, following the retirement of Satinder Kumar Saini. He was previously the General Officer Commanding-in-Chief (GOC-in-C) of the Southern Command, assuming command on January 30, 2020. He was trained at RIMC Dehradun.

Early life and education
Mohanty was born in Jagatsinghpur, Odisha to Jitendra K. Mohanty, a civil servant, and Sarada Mohanty, a professor of Odia at S.V.M. College. Following his education at Bagashai U. P. School, he joined the Rashtriya Indian Military College, Dehradun. He subsequently entered the National Defence Academy (NDA). He holds an M. Phil and a Master's in Management and has conducted extensive studies of China, South Asia, and northeastern India. He is a graduate of the Defence Services Staff College, Wellington.

Career
Mohanty was commissioned a second lieutenant in the Rajput Regiment in June 1982.
He has commanded battalions in both Jammu and Kashmir and in Northeast India, and has held staff appointments in an armoured brigade and in the military secretariat. He commanded a UN multi-national brigade in the Democratic Republic of the Congo and has served as a military advisor to the Seychelles government. He has also commanded a mountain brigade along the India-China border and a mountain division in  Assam in 2014. He also served as Director General of operational logistics and strategic movement at the Integrated Headquarters of the Ministry of Defence (Army) at New Delhi. After the Doklam standoff, he commanded the XXXIII Corps in the Eastern Command and was then appointed GOC Uttar Bharat Area at Bareilly.

Decorations

Dates of rank

References

Indian generals
Year of birth missing (living people)
Living people
People from Jagatsinghpur district
Military personnel from Odisha
Indian Army officers
Recipients of the Ati Vishisht Seva Medal
Recipients of the Vishisht Seva Medal
Recipients of the Sena Medal
National Defence Academy (India) alumni
Vice Chiefs of Army Staff (India)
Recipients of the Param Vishisht Seva Medal
Defence Services Staff College alumni
Rashtriya Indian Military College alumni